Cédric Demangeot (3 November 1974 – 28 January 2021) was a French poet. He was the founder of the journals Moriturus and Fissile.

Poetry

Theatre
Salomé (2019)

Other texts

Translations

References

1974 births
2021 deaths
French poets
Place of death missing
Place of birth missing